Hantaviridae is a family of viruses in the order Bunyavirales.  It is named for the Hantan River area in South Korea where an early outbreak of one of its species was observed.

Taxonomy
 Actantavirinae
 Actinovirus
 Agantavirinae
 Agnathovirus
 Mammantavirinae
 Loanvirus
 Mobatvirus
 Orthohantavirus
 Thottimvirus
 Repantavirinae
 Reptillovirus

References

 
Virus families
Bunyavirales